Linha do Norte is the Portuguese main railway line that connects the two main Portuguese cities, Lisbon and Porto. It goes through some other important cities like Vila Franca de Xira, Santarém, Entroncamento, Pombal, Coimbra, Aveiro, Espinho & Vila Nova de Gaia, amongst others. It constitutes the backbone of the Portuguese railway system of freight and passenger services, running approximately 720 trains (both freight and passenger) daily.

As part of the plans for a high-speed rail network, there will be a parallel high-speed line (up to ) to relieve this main line, since it has reached a saturation threshold where it's impossible to add additional freight trains without jamming the fast passenger services (InterCidades and Alfa Pendular).

See also 
 CP Urban Services
 List of railway lines in Portugal
 List of Portuguese locomotives and railcars
 History of rail transport in Portugal

References 

Nor
Iberian gauge railways